John or Jack Gilligan may refer to:

John Gilligan (criminal) (born 1952), Irish criminal
John J. Gilligan (1921–2013), Governor of Ohio
John Gilligan (footballer, born 1957), footballer for Swindon Town and Sligo
John Gilligan (footballer, born 1884) (1884–1946), Scottish footballer for Clyde
John Gilligan (mayor), independent councilor and former mayor of Limerick, 2008–2009
John Gilligan (hurler), Irish hurler
John Joseph Gilligan Jr. (1923–1942), United States Marine
Jack Gilligan (baseball) (1885–1980), Major League Baseball pitcher